Eatza Pizza was a buffet-style restaurant chain founded in Arizona in 1997. In 2007, it was one of the largest all-buffet pizza chains in the United States, with 112 locations in 14 states and Puerto Rico.

History
In March 2007, Eatza Pizza was bought by International Franchise Associates. Following the purchase, the corporate headquarters was moved from Arizona to Westport, Connecticut. In July 2008, International Franchise Associates filed for Chapter 7 bankruptcy. At that time, only five Eatza Pizza locations were left.

Fare
Their menu included at least 18 varieties of pizza, along with various other foods. When it was based in Scottsdale, the chain had 112 restaurants open or under development in Arizona, Alabama, California, Utah, Oregon, Washington, Idaho, Florida, Mississippi, North Carolina, Tennessee, Ohio and New Mexico, and Puerto Rico.

References

Buffet restaurants
Defunct companies based in Arizona
Defunct companies based in Connecticut
Defunct restaurant chains in the United States
Pizza chains of the United States
Defunct pizzerias
Regional restaurant chains in the United States
Restaurants established in 1997
Restaurants disestablished in 2008
Companies based in Westport, Connecticut